Gray Gables may refer to:

 Gray Gables, the summer residence of Grover Cleveland in Bourne, Massachusetts
 Gray Gables (Darlington, Maryland), listed on the National Register of Historic Places in Maryland
 Gray Gables (Winton, North Carolina), listed on the NRHP in Hertford County, North Carolina
 Grey Gables, the  retirement home of  AARP founder Dr. Ethel Percy Andrus
 Gray Gables (Tampa), a neighborhood within the City of Tampa, Florida
 Gray Gables Railroad Station, a former railroad station in Bourne, Massachusetts